Sitellitergus is a genus of parasitic flies in the family Tachinidae.

Species
Sitellitergus aemulus Reinhard, 1964
Sitellitergus simiolus Reinhard, 1964

References

Monotypic Brachycera genera
Dexiinae
Diptera of North America
Tachinidae genera